Paris Métro Line 16 is one of four new lines of Grand Paris Express, a major expansion project of the Paris Métro. Currently under construction, the line will connect the suburbs north and east of Paris in the Seine-Saint-Denis department, and is planned to open in two phases in 2026 and 2028. Line 16 will be fully automated (along with all Grand Paris Express lines) and fully underground.

The line is being built by Société du Grand Paris, a public agency set up by the French Government to deliver the Grand Paris Express project.

History 
Line 16 was first proposed as the eastern segment of the Grand Paris Express red line, a project launched by Nicolas Sarkozy in 2009 consisting of new automated Métro lines in the suburbs of Paris. In March 2013, the "New Grand Paris" project was announced by the Prime Minister at the time, Jean-Marc Ayrault. At this time, the line acquired its current line 16 naming.

The line between Saint-Denis Pleyel and Noisy–Champs is 27.5km in length, with 10 stations and a maintenance depot shared with Line 17. This section of the line is estimated to cost around €2.85bn. 3 stations will be shared with Line 17, including the western terminus at Saint-Denis Pleyel. 8 of the 10 stations will connect to other lines on the Paris transport network, including 4 metro lines, 4 RER lines and 2 Tramway lines.

The construction of the line was originally planned to start in 2017, and the line be completed by 2023. In February 2018, this was revised to complete the line by 2024, in time for the 2024 Olympic and Paralympic Games. A further delay to the project was announced in 2021, with the opening of the line split into 2 phases.

Construction 
The declaration of public utility was in December 2015, and preparatory construction work on the line began in February 2016. Major civil engineering began in February 2018. In February 2021, the last major construction contract was awarded, and all stations are now under construction, with 5 tunnel boring machines digging tunnels along the line.

, Saint-Denis Pleyel station will be completed first in 2024, as the station will serve the main stadium for Paris 2024. The section of line between Saint-Denis Pleyel and Clichy - Montfermeil is currently proposed to open in 2026, with an extension south to Noisy–Champs to open in 2028, completing the line.

Rolling stock 
In July 2018, Alstom was selected to supply the rolling stock for the Grand Paris Express project at a cost of €1.3bn for 183 trains. In March 2019, an order of 23 3-car trains was confirmed, albeit that the trains will be shared between lines 16 and 17. Shorter 3-car trains were ordered to reduce construction and operational costs, and that the lines are forecast to have a lower level of ridership than Line 15.

The specifications of the trains travelling line 16 and their operation are as follows :

 Train width :  minimum
 Train length : , made up of 3 cars with full-open interior gangways
 Train capacity : around 500 passengers
 Rails : iron
 Electric traction current : 1500 volt direct current via pantograph and contact wires
 Operation : Fully automated
 Maximum speed : 
 Operating speed: 
 Average interval : 3 to 4 minutes
 Minimum interval : 2 minutes

References

Transport in Paris
2024 in rail transport

Paris Métro line 16